John Peckett was the Lord Mayor of York through 1701–1702. He also served as the city's Sheriff in 1695. He was married to Alice Pawson, whose well-connected family succeeded John several times.

References

Lord Mayors of York
Year of death unknown
Year of birth unknown
18th-century deaths
17th-century births